Kavkoluğu is a small village in Gülnar district of  Mersin Province, Turkey. At  it is situated in Toros Mountains. The population of the village was 60  as of 2012. Main economic activity of the village is agriculture. But the arable land is limited. Various fruits including olive and citrus are produced. There is a lignite mine around the village. But at the present it is not active.

References

Villages in Gülnar District